Double Bay ferry wharf is located on the southern side of Sydney Harbour serving the Sydney suburb of Double Bay. The Australian 18 Footers League maintain a function centre adjacent to the wharf.

Services
Double Bay wharf is served by Sydney Ferries Double Bay services operated by First Fleet and SuperCat class ferries.

References

External links

Double Bay Wharf at Transport for New South Wales (Archived 12 June 2019)

Ferry wharves in Sydney